Guido de Castro Ficeclo (died 1147) was Italian Cardinal Deacon of S. Apollinare created by pope Innocent II in 1139. In 1139 he was governor of Benevento. He subscribed the papal bulls between 27 March 1140 and 27 December 1146. From 1142 until 1144 he served as papal legate in the Duchy of Bohemia. He participated in the papal election, 1145.

Bibliography
Luchesius Spätling, Kardinal Guido und seine Legation in Böhmen-Mären, in: Mitteilungen des Instituts für österreichische Geschichtsforschung, Universitäts Wien Institut für Geschichtsforschung und Archivwissenschaft in Wien, 1958, p. 306-330

12th-century Italian cardinals
1147 deaths
Year of birth unknown